Don't Fence Me In is a compilation album of phonograph records by Bing Crosby and The Andrews Sisters released in 1946 featuring Country and Western songs. This album contained the enormously popular record "Pistol Packin' Mama", which sold over a million copies and became the first number one hit on the then-new Juke Box Folk Song Records Chart that was later renamed the Hot Country Songs Chart.

Chart performance
The original 78rpm album peaked at number two on the Billboard Best-Selling Popular Record Albums chart in April 1946.

Original track listing
These previously released songs were featured on a 6-disc, 78 rpm album set, Decca Album No. A-417. The Andrews Sisters appear on Disc 1.

Re-issue track listing
In 1947, another set was released. It excluded two of the songs from the original album. The only design difference is that the text cylinder at the bottom was turned white. You can see the black one on the original album above. These previously released songs were featured on a 4-disc, 78 rpm album set, Decca Album No. A-559.

Disc 1 (23848): "Don't Fence Me In" / "Pistol Packin' Mama"
Disc 2 (23968): "New San Antonio Rose"/ "It Makes No Difference Now"
Disc 3 (23969): "You Are My Sunshine" / "Ridin' Down the Canyon" 
Disc 4 (23970): "Walking the Floor Over You" / "Nobody's Darlin' But Mine"

LP track listing
The 1949 10" LP album issue Decca DL 5063  consisted of eight songs on one 33 1/3 rpm record. All were reissues of earlier recordings:

Side 1

Side 2

References

Bing Crosby compilation albums
1946 compilation albums
Decca Records compilation albums
Country albums by American artists
Country music compilation albums
The Andrews Sisters compilation albums